Bangs (North American English), or a fringe (British English), are strands or locks of hair that fall over the scalp's front hairline to cover the forehead, usually just above the eyebrows, though can range to various lengths. While most people cut their bangs straight, they may also shape them in an arc or leave them ragged.

Terminology
The term bangs originally referred to hair cut bang-off (i.e., straight across at the front), although the term is now applied to diverse forms of hair styling. It is probably related to bang-tail, a term still used for the practice of cutting horses' tails straight across. The term fringe refers to the resemblance of the short row of hair to ornamental fringe trim, such as those often found on shawls.

History

Bangs occur naturally in many styles of short hair-cuts.

Hairstyles that feature bangs have come and gone out of fashion as frequently as other hairstyles, and they can be worn in any number of ways. Influential people with bangs in modern times (since the 20th century) have included silent movie actress Louise Brooks, 1950s glamor model Bettie Page, the Beatles, and actress Elizabeth Taylor in the title role of Cleopatra (1963).

In the 1970s, English actress and singer Jane Birkin helped establish the iconic look of brow-length bangs combined with overall long hair.

In the late 1980s and early 1990s, curly, teased bangs were in fashion, often held very big or high in place with copious amounts of hair spray. This style was called "mall bangs".

In 2007, bangs saw another massive revival as a hair trend, this time thick, deep and blunt-cut. In October 2007, style icon and model Kate Moss changed her hairstyle to have bangs, signalling the continuation of the trend into 2008.

Fringes also had another revival during the 2020s, particularly self-styled curtain bangs, mainly on social media apps such as TikTok.

See also
List of hairstyles
Bowl cut
Mop top haircut

References

External links
 
 

20th-century fashion
21st-century fashion
Hairstyles